United Victory is a Maldivian professional football club. They have qualified for the Dhivehi Premier League for the very first time, after crowning the 2015 Second Division Football Tournament

Current squad

References

External links
Andrej Keric and Mahmoud Al Youssef have signed for United Victory Sports Club in Maldives

Football clubs in the Maldives
Association football clubs established in 1973
Dhivehi Premier League clubs